Off Season is a 1992 comedy film by Daniel Schmid, who also co-wrote the screenplay with Martin Suter. The film is semi-autobiographical for Schmid, who re-imagines the hotel he grew up in the Swiss Alps. The French-Swiss-German co-production premiered at the Locarno International Film Festival in August 1992, followed by a screening at the Toronto International Film Festival on 12 September 1992. The film was the Swiss submission for the Academy Award for Best Foreign Language Film, but was not accepted as a nominee.

Plot
Adult narrator, (Sami Frey) recalls his mysterious childhood at a mountainside hotel which he shared with his mother, grandmother and the hotel's guests. The hotel is host to a series of interesting guests, from the actress, Sarah Bernhardt (Paredes), an anarchist assassin (Chaplin), torch singers and seductive women.

Cast
Sami Frey as Narrator
Maria Maddalena Fellini as Grandma
Marisa Paredes as Sarah Bernhardt
Geraldine Chaplin as Anarchist
Ingrid Caven as Lilo
Andréa Ferréol as Mlle Gabriel
Arielle Dombasle as Mme. Studer
Maurice Garrel as Grandpa
Dieter Meier as Max
Ulli Lommel as Prof. Malini
Carlos Devesa as Valentin
Irene Olgiati as Couple

Reception
The film was well received by Variety, "Hors Saison is an unabashed cinematic circus populated by a Fellini-like cast of caricatures. It is irony and good humour make it high-class, entertainment for family audiences as well as the director's art house fans." David Robinson wrote in The Times that the film offers "rich nostalgia" and that it "delights in the colourful ghosts of the place [hotel]".

See also
 List of submissions to the 65th Academy Awards for Best Foreign Language Film
 List of Swiss submissions for the Academy Award for Best Foreign Language Film

References

External links
 

1992 films
French comedy films
Swiss comedy films
German comedy films
Films set in hotels
Films directed by Daniel Schmid
1992 comedy films
Cultural depictions of Sarah Bernhardt
1993 comedy films
1993 films
1990s French-language films
French-language Swiss films
1990s French films
1990s German films